Henry Gray (7 July 1915– 7 September 1978) was an Irish hurler who played as a centre-forward for the Laois and Dublin senior team.

Gray made his first appearance for the Laois team during the 1934 championship and later joined the Dublin team. He ended his career with Laois after the 1949 championship. During that time he won one All-Ireland medal, five Leinster medals and one National Hurling League medal.

At club level Gray won numerous county club championship medals with Rathdowney in Laois and Faughs in Dublin.

The trophy for the Laois minor hurling championship is named in his honour.

References

1915 births
1978 deaths
Rathdowney hurlers
Faughs hurlers
Laois inter-county hurlers
Dublin inter-county hurlers
Leinster inter-provincial hurlers
All-Ireland Senior Hurling Championship winners